Sirajnagar Halt is a railway station of the Sealdah-Lalgola line in the Eastern Railway zone of Indian Railways. The station is situated at Sirajnagar, under Rejinagar police station in Murshidabad district in the Indian state of West Bengal. It serves Sirajnagar, Andulberia and nearby villages. Lalgola Passengers and EMU pass through the station.

Electrification
The Krishnanagar– section, including Rejinagar railway station was electrified in 2004. In 2010 the line became double tracked.

References

Railway stations in Murshidabad district
Sealdah railway division
Kolkata Suburban Railway stations